Cruz das Almas (translation: Souls' Cross) is a municipality, in the state of Bahia, in Brazil. Founded in 1897, it is home to the Federal University of Recôncavo da Bahia and is one of the main cities of Bahia. In 2020, it had a population of 63,591 inhabitants. Its climate is tropical, hot and humid. The economy is based on agriculture, especially tobacco, orange and cassava production. It is also home of the Embrapa cassava and tropical fruits. Cruz das Almas is well known for its Saint John Festival in June, where fireworks are used as "espadas" in a beautiful but dangerous game.

Population history

Persons

Famous persons includes the featherweight boxer Sertão.

References

External links
 https://www.cidade-brasil.com.br/municipio-cruz-das-almas.html

Municipalities in Bahia